Nathan Van Hooydonck (born 12 October 1995) is a Belgian cyclist, who currently rides for UCI WorldTeam . 

In August 2019, he was named in the startlist for the 2019 Vuelta a España. In 2021 he entered his second edition of  the Vuelta, his first riding for Team Jumbo-Visma. He rode in support of Primož Roglič, who won the race. He was named to the team for the 2022 Tour de France and ended up playing an important role. Between Roglič, Vingegaard and van Aert fighting for stage wins, jerseys and the Tour de France itself, Van Hooydonck was one of the domestiques doing whatever was asked of him for the team. He had to leave the race just two stages before the end, due to a personal matter beyond his control.

He is the son of former professional cyclist Gino and the nephew of two-time Tour of Flanders winner Edwig Van Hooydonck.

Major results

2012
 2nd Road race, National Junior Road Championships
 3rd Ronde van Vlaanderen Juniores
 4th Omloop der Vlaamse Gewesten
 6th Time trial, UCI Junior Road World Championships
2013
 1st Overall Keizer der Juniores
 2nd Time trial, National Junior Road Championships
 2nd Paris–Roubaix Juniors
 3rd La Philippe Gilbert
 3rd Omloop der Vlaamse Gewesten
 4th Overall GP Général Patton
 4th Ronde van Vlaanderen Juniores
 7th Overall Course de la Paix Juniors
2015
 National Under-23 Road Championships
1st  Road race
2nd Time trial
 3rd Overall Olympia's Tour
1st  Young rider classification
 8th Paris–Tours Espoirs
2016
 2nd Kernen Omloop Echt-Susteren
 3rd Overall Ronde de l'Oise
1st  Young rider classification
1st Stage 4
 3rd Chrono Champenois
 4th Overall Tour de Berlin
1st Stage 1 (TTT)
 4th Circuit de Wallonie
 5th Time trial, UEC European Under-23 Road Championships
 5th Omloop Het Nieuwsblad Beloften
 6th Internationale Wielertrofee Jong Maar Moedig
 9th Overall Le Triptyque des Monts et Châteaux
2017
 5th Road race, National Road Championships
 5th Paris–Roubaix Espoirs
2018
 4th Overall Dubai Tour
2021
 7th Gent–Wevelgem
2023
 1st Stage 3 (TTT) Paris–Nice
 2nd Kuurne–Brussels–Kuurne

Grand Tour general classification results timeline

References

External links

1995 births
Living people
Belgian male cyclists
People from Wuustwezel
Cyclists from Antwerp Province